The European Union Prize for Contemporary Architecture – Mies van der Rohe Award is a prize given biennially by the European Union and the Fundació Mies van der Rohe, Barcelona, 'to acknowledge and reward quality architectural production in Europe'.

The Prize was created in 1987 through an equal partnership among the European Commission, the European Parliament and the Fundació Mies van der Rohe. The award is open to all the works completed in Europe within the two-year period before the granting of the prize. Nominations are submitted by independent experts, the national architecture associations and the advisory committee of the Prize, and then evaluated by a jury organized for each cycle. The five finalist works are visited by the jury, which chooses a prize winner and names an Emerging Architect winner.

As of 2016, a new category, the Young Talent Architecture Award (YTAA), highlights the final degree projects of recently graduated architects, landscape architects and urban designers. YTAA, as an inherent part of the European Union Prize for Contemporary Architecture – Mies van der Rohe Award, is organised by the Fundació Mies van der Rohe with the support of the Creative Europe programme of the European Union. YTAA is organised in partnership with the European Association for Architectural Education (EAAE) and the Architects’ Council of Europe (ACE-CAE); World Architects as a founding partner; the European Cultural Centre as a partner in Venice; sponsored by Jung, Jansen and Regent; and with the support of USM.

List of award winners

List of Emerging Architect Special Mention

See also 
List of architecture prizes

References

External links
 YTAA website
 Fundació Mies van der Rohe website
 Creative Europe website

Architecture awards
Contemporary architecture
Awards established in 1987